Maacoccus arundinariae is a species of scale insect in the family Coccidae. It is most commonly found in Sri Lanka.

References

Insects of Sri Lanka
Coccidae